Robert Sidgwick (7 August 1851 – 1934) was an English amateur first-class cricketer, who played nine matches for Yorkshire County Cricket Club in 1882, and one game for Jamaica against R.S. Lewis' XI in 1894/95.

Born in Embsay, near Skipton, Yorkshire, England, Sidgwick was a right-handed batsman, who scored 72 runs at 4.80, with a best score of 17 against Kent.  He also took seven catches in the field.

Sidgwick died in 1934 in Kingston, Jamaica.

References

External links
Cricinfo Profile
Cricket Archive Statistics
Studio portrait

1851 births
1934 deaths
Yorkshire cricketers
Jamaica cricketers
English cricketers
People from Skipton
Jamaican cricketers
Sportspeople from Yorkshire